Paul Dirac (1902–1984) was a Swiss-British theoretical physicist, Nobel laureate, and a founder of the field of quantum physics.

Dirac may also refer to:

Physics
 DiRAC, Distributed Research using Advanced Computing (Supercomputing facility)
 Dirac bracket, a generalization of the Poisson bracket
 Dirac constant, a historical name for the reduced Planck constant
 Dirac fermion, a fermion which is not its own antiparticle
 Dirac equation, a relativistic quantum mechanical wave equation
 Dirac notation, a standard notation for describing quantum states
 Dirac equation in particle physics
 Dirac large numbers hypothesis relating the size scale of the universe to the scales between different physical forces
 Dirac sea

Mathematics
 Dirac's theorem on Hamiltonian cycles, the statement that an -vertex graph in which each vertex has degree at least  must have a Hamiltonian cycle
 Dirac's theorem on chordal graphs, the characterization of chordal graphs as graphs in which all minimal separators are cliques
 Dirac's theorem on cycles in -connected graphs, the result that for every set of  vertices in a -vertex-connected graph there exists a cycle that passes through all the vertices in the set
 Dirac delta function

Other uses
 5997 Dirac, a main-belt asteroid
 Dirac (software), a relativistic quantum chemistry program
 Dirac (video compression format), an open digital video codec developed by BBC Research
 Dirac, Charente, a commune of the Charente département, in France
 Dirac measure, a mathematical measure that is a probability measure
 Dirac observables, see loop quantum gravity
 Dirac (dress), a Somali dress
 Dirac Medal

See also
 Dirac delta function, a generalized mathematical function
 Gabriel Andrew Dirac (1925–1984), graph theorist, Paul Dirac's stepson
 Dirak, former name of the town Karnut, Armenia
 Fermi–Dirac (disambiguation)